Love Jones is an American band from Louisville, Kentucky formed in 1990 and consists of Ben Daughtrey (vocals, percussion),  Barry Thomas (bass), Chris Hawpe (vocals, guitar), Jonathan Palmer (vocals), and Stuart Johnson (drums).

Love Jones was prominent among the "Cocktail Nation" groups of the early 1990s. The genre — which included Combustible Edison, The Cocktails and Donkey — was a reaction to the grunge music of the early 1990s. Cocktail Nation bands celebrated the aesthetics and music of the 1950s and early 1960s — lounge jazz, crooning pop, and martinis. Love Jones played any sort of pop music that fit within that label: pop, blues, R&B, bossa nova, doo wop.

Love Jones formed in Louisville in 1990, along with bands like Slint and Palace Brothers, demonstrating the diversity of the Louisville music scene.  In 1992, Love Jones moved to Los Angeles and staged a weekly Thursday night residency show at the famed nightclub Largo. The show featured frequent guest performer Jon Brion, who appears on several Love Jones recordings.

Albums
In 1992 Love Jones signed with Zoo Entertainment/BMG shortly after releasing a single on Minty Fresh Records. The band was first brought to the attention of Zoo Entertainment/BMG by guitarist Adam Jones of  Tool, who were with the label at the time. The band would eventually contribute the hidden track "Santa Monica and Orange" to Love Jones' debut album for Zoo, 1993's Here's to the Losers.

Here's to the Losers—co-produced by the band and Rod O'Brien—contains a wide mix of styles, including disco, Blaxploitation film soundtracks, samba, soul and funk. Key tracks include "Central Avenue," "Li'l Black Book," "Custom Van," "Drive-In," "Ohio River" and "Fragile." Jon Brion is featured on many tracks, playing piano and organ. Ben Daughtrey directed the music video for "Pineapple."

1995's Powerful Pain Relief—co-produced by the band and Paul duGré—reveals more of Love Jones' influences, including Isaac Hayes, early Chicago, Earth Wind & Fire and Chic. Key tracks include the title track, "World of Summer," "You Don't Know Me" and "The Thing." Jon Brion again contributes, playing various keyboards on several tracks. Liz Friedlander directed the music video for "The Thing."

2010's independent release Forever—co-produced by Love Jones and Matthew Libman—includes key tracks "Charm City" and "Hey California."

Discography

Impact
Love Jones' signature song "Paid For Lovin was featured in the film Swingers after the band developed a relationship with Jon Favreau and Vince Vaughn, who frequently attended Love Jones' shows. Love Jones bassist Barry Thomas was a Music Consultant on Swingers.

In addition to recorded works and live performances, Love Jones appeared in the films Since You've Been Gone directed by David Schwimmer, and French Exit (1995 film) starring Jonathan Silverman and Mädchen Amick. They also appeared in the 2002 Cameron Diaz film The Sweetest Thing as the wedding band.  They can also be seen in the Pedro Zamora tribute episode of The Real World: San Francisco.

The band performed two songs on The Tonight Show Starring Jimmy Fallon on January 10, 2019, "Here's to the Losers" and "Ohio River", joined by Jimmy Fallon on the latter.

References

External links
 
 
 

American pop music groups
Musical groups from Louisville, Kentucky
Musical groups established in 1990
1990 establishments in Kentucky